Corowa  is a town in the state of New South Wales in Australia. It is on the bank of the Murray River, the border between New South Wales and Victoria, opposite the Victorian town of Wahgunyah.  It is the largest town in the Federation Council and was the administrative centre of the former Corowa Shire. The name could have derived from an Aboriginal word referring to the curra pine which yielded gum used by Aboriginal people to fasten the heads of spears to the shafts. Another translation is "rocky river".

There are two bridges over the Murray to Wahgunyah in Victoria: the heritage-listed John Foord Bridge and the Federation Bridge (opened on 2 April 2005). The town in conjunction with nearby town Rutherglen had an Australian Rules football team (Corowa-Rutherglen), competing in the Ovens & Murray Football League, although they are currently in recess.
Corowa Cougars compete in the Murray Cup rugby league competition.

History

Bangerang
The Aboriginal people from the area are the Bangarang people.
The tribe of Indigenous Australians that inhabited the Corowa area were called, in their own language, the Bangerang Tribe.  The name has various spellings in English, varying all the way from Bandjalang through Panderang to Pinegorine.

Foord's punt
John Foord ( – 15 February 1883) "The Emperor of Wahgunyah", settled on the Murray River near the Ovens junction (on the southern side of the river) in the early 1840s. In about 1843 Foord and a man named Bould examined the country about the present site of Wahgunyah and recommended it to John Crisp, who was the first European to settle in the area. Later Crisp sold his land to John Foord.  With the development of steamer transport on the Murray River in the mid-1850s, Foord purchased a punt which was brought up to Wahgunyah by the steamer Leichhardt. Foord built two extensive warehouses which he let to river navigation companies. Traffic was attracted to Foord's punt, leading to the establishment of Corowa township, opposite to Wahgunyah. In October 1892, the Corowa railway line opened from Culcairn. It closed in January 1989.

Township development

Land was surveyed in 1857 at Corowa by Surveyor Adams and the next year the township was proclaimed. In September 1859 a meeting was held to consider the erection of a bridge between Wahgunyah and Corowa to replace the punt. Construction of a bridge was commenced early in 1861 and the completed structure cost about £8,000. The bridge construction was probably privately funded.

Corowa Post Office opened on 1 January 1861.

In 1861 an Anglican church was built at Corowa on land donated by John Foord.

It was reported in 1868 that Corowa "was fast becoming one of the most important of the border districts". Buildings erected that year included a new store, two hotels and a new court-house.

A branch of the Bank of New South Wales was established in a new brick structure at Corowa in 1874. The building of a Roman Catholic church commenced in September 1874. A report in 1875 stated that Corowa as a township "was making rapid strides". The township had a total of seven hotels. A "private township" had been laid out at Corowa on land formerly owned by Sanger and Foord, with the land selling at £80 to £100 per acre. The Government township, laid out about two miles from the river, was deemed a failure.

A report published in The Sydney Mail in October 1879 stated that Corowa township consisted of one thoroughfare containing the business houses. On a nearby hill the residences of the wealthier residents had been erected. It was claimed that the Government town of Corowa, two miles from the river, was "a vast wilderness". It was postulated that the reason for the failure of this township to develop was the fact that only one approach to the bridge from that point could be obtained. The toll for crossing the bridge was said to be "somewhat exorbitant," and prevented free intercourse between Corowa and Wahgunyah.

Later developments
In 1882 the bridge between Corowa and Wahgunyah was purchased by the New South Wales Government.

A Presbyterian church and an Oddfellows' Hall were built at Corowa in 1886 .

In the 1890s, Corowa was the site of several important conferences leading to the federation of the various colonies into the Commonwealth of Australia in 1901.

Heritage listings 
Corowa has a number of heritage-listed sites, including:
 8 Church Street: Corowa Courthouse
 Culcairn-Corowa railway: Corowa railway station
 Steel Street: Corowa Flour Mill

Climate
Corowa has a temperate Mediterranean climate (Csa) with hot, mostly dry summers and cool wetter winters.

Prominent people
 Sam Groth - Australian tennis player
 Charles Raymond Gurney - Australian aviator and WW2 pilot, born in Corowa
 John Howard - Actor born in Corowa
 Nigel Lappin - Australian rules football player born in Corowa
 John Longmire - Retired Australian rules football player, played for North Melbourne Football Club from 1988 to 1999, coach of Sydney Swans since 2011
 Ben Mathews - Australian rules football played for Sydney Swans from 1997 to 2008
 Stephen Mowlam - Australian Field Hockey Player who grew up in, and played hockey for Corowa
 Joey Palmer - Cricketer in the 1880s born in Corowa
 Cathy Svarc - AFLW player
 Ruby Svarc - AFLW player
 Blake Pavey - Comedian born in Corowa
 Mike Walsh - Television host

In popular culture
The Corowa Bowling Club was used to film scenes for the 2002 film Crackerjack.

References

External links

 
Towns in the Riverina
Towns in New South Wales
Populated places on the Murray River
Federation Council, New South Wales